The year 1948 in archaeology involved some significant events.

Explorations
 Caral site in Peru identified by Paul Kosok.

Excavations
 Excavations at Nippur sponsored by the Oriental Institute of the University of Chicago begin directed by Richard C. Haines.
 Excavations at Kültepe in Turkey resume.

Publications
 Archaeological Institute of America begins publishing the magazine Archaeology.
 Walter W. Taylor publishes A Study of Archeology, a work that carries on from his 1943 PhD dissertation to Harvard University faculty.

Finds
November - First torc from Snettisham Hoard discovered near King's Lynn, England.
Therizinosaurus is discovered in Mongolia and is thought to be a very large turtle for several years.

Awards
 Maud Cunnington made CBE for services to archaeology, the first woman archaeologist to receive the honour.

Miscellaneous
 M. M. Postan of Cambridge convenes an influential meeting of archaeologists and historians to discuss the possibilities of excavating medieval peasant houses in England.
 A Roman mosaic pavement from Brantingham in the East Riding of Yorkshire (England) is stolen.

Births

 July 13 - Richard Avent, British archaeologist, conservationist and civil servant (d. 2006)

Deaths
 September 2 - Sylvanus G. Morley, American Mayanist (born 1883).

References

Archaeology
Archaeology
Archaeology by year